The following elections occurred in the year 1920.

 1920 Histadrut election

Africa
 1920 South African general election
 1920 Southern Rhodesian Legislative Council election

Asia

 1920 Madras Presidency Legislative Council election

Europe
 1920 Estonian parliamentary election
 1920 Free City of Danzig Constituent Assembly election
 1920 German federal election
 1920 Greek legislative election
 1920 Austrian legislative election
 1920 Bulgarian parliamentary election
 1920 Czechoslovak parliamentary election
 1920 Kingdom of Serbs, Croats and Slovenes Constitutional Assembly election
 1920 Swedish general election
 1920 Austrian legislative election
 East Prussian plebiscite

Denmark 

 April 1920 Danish Folketing election
 July 1920 Danish Folketing election
 September 1920 Danish Folketing election
 August 1920 Danish Landsting election
 October 1920 Danish Landsting election

United Kingdom
 1920 Argyll by-election
 1920 Ashton-under-Lyne by-election
 1920 Horncastle by-election
 1920 Ilford by-election
 1920 Louth by-election
 1920 Middleton and Prestwich by-election
 1920 South Norfolk by-election
 1920 Northampton by-election
 1920 Paisley by-election
 1920 Rhondda West by-election
 1920 Stockport by-election

North America

Canada
 1920 British Columbia general election
 1920 Canadian liquor plebiscite
 1920 Conservative Party of Ontario leadership election
 1920 Edmonton municipal election
 1920 Manitoba general election
 1920 New Brunswick general election
 1920 Nova Scotia general election
 1920 Toronto municipal election
 1920 Yukon general election

United States

Federal
 1920 United States presidential election
 1920 United States Senate elections
 1920 United States House of Representatives elections
 United States House of Representatives elections in California, 1920
 United States House of Representatives elections in South Carolina, 1920
 United States Senate election in South Carolina, 1920

States
 1920 Louisiana gubernatorial election
 1920 Minnesota gubernatorial election
 1920 New York state election
 1920 South Carolina gubernatorial election

South America 
 1920 Argentine legislative election
 1920 Chilean presidential election
 April 1920 Guatemalan presidential election
 August 1920 Guatemalan presidential election
 1920 Nicaraguan general election
 1920 Panamanian presidential election

Oceania

Australia
 1920 Kalgoorlie by-election
 1920 New South Wales state election
 1920 Queensland state election

New Zealand
 1920 Bruce by-election
 1920 Stratford by-election

See also
 :Category:1920 elections

1920
Elections